Statistics of Nemzeti Bajnokság I for the 1924–25 season.

Overview 
It was contested by 12 teams, and MTK Hungária FC won the championship.

League standings

Results

References 
 Hungary - List of final tables (RSSSF)

Nemzeti Bajnokság I seasons
Hun
1924–25 in Hungarian football